Belgrano is a 2010 Argentine adventure drama TV film, based on the life of the Argentine national hero Manuel Belgrano. It is being produced in the context of the Argentina Bicentennial, which raised the public interest in the May Revolution and the Argentine War of Independence. Pablo Rago, one of the actors of the aforementioned movie, had the lead role as Belgrano. He left the TV series Botineras before its ending, in order to take part in this movie.

The first scenes of the film were filmed in Quilmes, playing scene at Posta de Yatasto where Manuel Belgrano hands the command of the Army of the North to José de San Martín, played by Pablo Echarri. The film is scheduled to be filmed both at Buenos Aires and Tucuman.

Valeria Bertucelli played María Josefa Ezcurra, Belgrano's lover. Sebastián Pivoto declared that he intended to provide a more humane, less idealized, interpretation of the life of Belgrano.

The film premiered on November 27, 2010, at a public event at the National Flag Memorial in Rosario.

References

External links
 
2010 films
2010 biographical drama films
2010 television films
Argentine biographical films
Argentine adventure drama films
Manuel Belgrano
2010s Spanish-language films
Films directed by Juan José Campanella
Cultural depictions of José de San Martín
Works about the Argentine War of Independence
Films set in the 1810s
Films set in Argentina
2010s Argentine films